Agatheira  was a town of ancient Lydia, inhabited during Hellenistic times. Its site is located near Halitpaşa in Asiatic Turkey. This colony was called a katoikiai, along with Magnesia-by-Sipylus, Hyrcanis, and Thyateira.

Evidence shows that Macedonians settled in Agatheira, such as an inscription at Hyrcanis, which contained insights regarding the settlers' organizational structure. There was also a record that cited Macedonian settlers honoring a certain Seleukos son of Menekrates during the reign of Eumenes II (188–158 BC). This event transpired during a period of "polisification" of the non-polis colonial settlements in west Anatolia.

References

Populated places in ancient Lydia
Former populated places in Turkey
History of Manisa Province